Scuola Italiana Design (Italian School of Design, SID) was the first higher education Institute established in the Northeast of Italy.

History 

Scuola Italiana Design was established in 1991 in Padua. Since 2001 it has been the educational department of the Scientific and Technological Park "Galileo".

Education 

Its educational program consists mainly of a three-year Study Plan in Creative Design, a one-year Master in Creative Design, a series of seminars, workshops and brief courses.

The Institute created a workshop in which participants develop concept designs on the Croatian seaside, named "SID Summer Workshop".

Educational collaborations are underway with other European institutes, such as Vilnius Academy of Fine Arts (Lithuania), Kielce Technology Park (Poland) and MSTUM (Russia).

Memberships 

Scuola Italiana Design is a member of ADI (Associazione per il Disegno Industriale) and translated into 'Italian the Code of Ethics of designers for ICSID' (International Council of Societies of Industrial Design).

Sources

External links 
 
 Galileo Park

Education in Padua
Design schools